John Hubert Sherratt (9 March 1923 – 1975) was an English amateur footballer who played at centre-forward for Port Vale in 1949.

Career
Sherratt joined Port Vale in January 1949, and made his debut in a 3–1 defeat by Swansea Town at Vetch Field on 5 March. He played just one more game in 1948–49, before being released by manager Gordon Hodgson in the summer.

Career statistics
Source:

References

1923 births
1975 deaths
Footballers from Stoke-on-Trent
English footballers
Association football forwards
Port Vale F.C. players
English Football League players